Paraleprodera crucifera is a species of beetle in the family Cerambycidae. It was described by Johan Christian Fabricius in 1793. It is known from Sri Lanka and India.

References

Lamiini
Beetles described in 1793